"A Nation Awakens" is the 296th and 297th special two-part episode of the fourth season of the Sony TV television series Crime Patrol (features real crime stories) and 546th and 547th episodes overall. Originally aired in two parts on 21 September and 22 September 2013, the episodes were written by Subramanian S. Iyer and director by R. Amit Kumar Jha. The principal photography of the episodes was held in Mumbai, India and was commenced in the first week of January 2013. The episode was hosted by Anup Soni and role of head police inspector was played by Sanjeev Tyagi.

Plot

The two-part episode is about the 16 December 2012 incident, the day when in a moving bus, a 23-year-old physiotherapy intern was brutally raped by six people, including a juvenile. She was travelling with her male friend. The incident is termed as the most heinous crime that one can commit with someone. The episodes were to be aired on 11 and 12 January 2013, but on the day when it had to be premiered, the Information and broadcasting Ministry of India had asked Sony TV not to air those episodes.

On 10 September 2013, the channel got the green signal from the Information and broadcasting Ministry of India to telecast the two-part episode on the show, and then the channel subsequently aired the promos of the episode from the same date. The episode was then telecast in two parts on 21 September and 22 September 2013.

Reception

Critical response
After telecasting the special two-part episode on the respective channel, the episodes had made Crime Patrol the number one show on 21 and 22 September 2013 on Indian television. Sneha Rajani, executive vice president and business head of Sony TV, told IANS, "We had a total of 10.4 million TVTs (Television Viewership in Thousands)." The channel had decided to repeat the episode.

References

External links
Full episode

2013 television episodes